The Deputy Chair of the Senate of Kazakhstan is a post in the upper house of the Parliament which is the Senate of Kazakhstan. The Deputy Chair is nominated by the Senate Chair who are then elected by the Senators. The post was established on 30 January 1996 and since the constitutional amendments in May 2007, the office has been occupied by two people at the same time. The Deputy Chair carries out tasks made by Senate Chair and responsibilities if the chair isn't able to fulfill them.

The Deputy Chair could be dismissed by the Senators only with the proposal by the Chair.

List of Deputy Chairs

References 

Government of Kazakhstan